"Jennifer She Said" is a song by British band Lloyd Cole and the Commotions, released in 1987 as the second single from their third and final studio album Mainstream (1987). The song was written by the band and produced by Ian Stanley. It peaked at number 31 in the UK Singles Chart and remained in the top 75 for five weeks.

Background
Speaking of the song's lyrics, Cole told Smash Hits in 1988,

Critical reception
Upon its release as a single, Bob Stanley of NME praised "Jennifer She Said" as "a charming vignette to tattoos and marriage" that "yields all those deft lyrical twists which seemed to have deserted Cole after the self-parody of Easy Pieces and the forgettable 'My Bag'". He considered it the band's "best single in yonks" and noted it could have been "one of the finer moments" from the band's 1984 debut album Rattlesnakes. He added, "Most impressive is the way in which the production includes nothing but a small string section for frills. Delightful." Jerry Smith of Music Week described it as a "superb track" and added that, in light of the preceding single's failure to reach the top 40, "If talent like this can't result in hits, then God help us!" Kate Davies of Number One awarded three out of five stars and commented, "One of the best things they've had out for yonks. Lloyd's got the sort of voice that soon gets under your skin once you've got used to its compelling breathiness."

Marcus Hodge of the Cambridge Evening News praised it as the "strongest song" from Mainstream and added, "Lloyd at his best, being both literary and tuneful. Hope it's a hit." In a 2012 feature on the song, Jim Griffin, writing for The Guardian, described it as his favourite Lloyd Cole song and noted the "jangly guitars", "croaked delivery" and lyrics "about the fickle nature of early romance".

Track listing
7–inch single (UK, Europe and Australasia)
"Jennifer She Said" – 3:03
"Perfect Blue" – 4:13

12–inch single (UK, Europe and Australasia)
"Jennifer She Said" – 3:03
"Perfect Blue" – 4:13
"Mystery Train" (Recorded live at 'The World' USA 1986) – 2:48
"I Don't Believe You" (Recorded live at 'The World' USA 1986) – 3:04

CD single (UK and Europe)
"Jennifer She Said" – 3:03
"Perfect Blue" – 4:13
"My Bag" (Dancing Remix) – 6:38

Personnel
Lloyd Cole and the Commotions
 Lloyd Cole – vocals, guitar
 Neil Clark – guitar
 Blair Cowan – keyboards
 Lawrence Donegan – bass
 Stephen Irvine – drums

Additional musicians
 Nicky Holland – string arrangements ("Jennifer She Said")

Production
 Ian Stanley – producer ("Jennifer She Said", "My Bag")
 Femi Jiya – recording ("Jennifer She Said")
 Bruce Lampcov – mixing ("Jennifer She Said")
 Paul Hardiman – producer ("Perfect Blue")
 François Kevorkian – remixer ("My Bag")

Other
 Alastair Thain – photography
 Michael Nash Associates – sleeve

Charts

References

1987 songs
1987 singles
1988 singles
Lloyd Cole songs
Songs written by Neil Clark (musician)
Songs written by Lloyd Cole
Song recordings produced by Ian Stanley
Polydor Records singles